Barry Ritholtz is an American author, newspaper columnist, blogger, equities analyst, CIO of Ritholtz Wealth Management, and guest commentator on Bloomberg Television. Ritholtz is the host of the Bloomberg Podcast Masters in Business in which he interviews influential figures on markets, investing and business. He is also a former contributor to CNBC and TheStreet.com.

Ritholtz, along with Ritholtz Wealth Management peers Ben Carlson, Josh Brown, and Michael Batnick, runs a blog with insights on financial markets entitled The Big Picture.

Prior to founding Ritholtz Wealth Management, Ritholtz was CEO of Fusion IQ, prior to that chief market strategist at Maxim Group in New York, an investment bank.

Writing
Ritholtz is the author of Bailout Nation, published in 2009. He also writes an investing column for The Washington Post, and a blog, The Big Picture. In 2010, Ritholtz was named one of the "15 Most Important Economic Journalists" by The Daily Beast.
In 2009, he published his first book, Bailout Nation: How Greed and Easy Money Corrupted Wall Street and Shook the World Economy.

Early life
Ritholtz graduated from Stony Brook University with a degree in Political Science and a minor in Philosophy . He was a member of the school's equestrian team, and competed in the 1981 National Championships of the Intercollegiate Horse Show Association. After graduation, Ritholtz studied at Yeshiva University’s Benjamin N. Cardozo School of Law in New York, graduating cum laude in 1989 with a J.D. He passed the Bar exams in New York and New Jersey. He went on to practice law for a few years.

References

External links
 The Big Picture (Ritholtz's blog)
 Bloomberg View columns
 Washington Post columns
 
 Masters in Business - Podcast App Links & Page - Plink

Living people
American business writers
American bloggers
American economics writers
American male non-fiction writers
American finance and investment writers
Benjamin N. Cardozo School of Law alumni
21st-century American non-fiction writers
American male bloggers
Year of birth missing (living people)